Sutton Coldfield railway station is the main railway station for the town of Sutton Coldfield, Birmingham, West Midlands, England.

The station is of Victorian architecture with red brick and elaborate ceilings and pillars. One platform is sheltered while the other is open air. The main building itself is built on a hill with a tunnel running underneath it. It is accessed via Station Street and Railway Road.

History
The station was constructed in 1862, as the northern terminus of the line from Birmingham built by the London and North Western Railway. In 1884, the line was extended north to Lichfield, and after the grouping of railway companies in 1923, it came under the control of the London, Midland and Scottish Railway.

The station was the location of the Sutton Coldfield train disaster on 23 January 1955 when an express from York to Bristol travelling at excessive speed derailed.  A memorial to the 17 people who died was unveiled in the station concourse on 23 January 2016.

From 1978, the station became one of those served by the new Cross-City Line, sponsored by the West Midlands Passenger Transport Executive. As part of that scheme, there were proposals to demolish the station and rebuild it, as happened to many of the other stations on the line. However, local campaigning saved it.

2003 repairwork
Following the provision of a large sum of money in 2003, the station underwent a programme of refurbishment. Many new facilities were provided, and repair work was undertaken to the station building. The southbound platform was repainted and a former wooden ticket office removed because it had become a target for vandalism and concerns were raised about its fire safety. A new ticket vending machine was placed on the platform which reduced queues at the ticket office in the main building. A station shop and a new waiting room were provided. On the northbound platform, the small waiting room was replaced with new seats.  Passenger information system boards were also installed on both platforms which provides passengers with up-to-the-minute information on train times. The interior of the station was also repainted and the ticket office in the main building was extended.

Services 

The station is served by West Midlands Trains with local Transport for West Midlands branded "Cross-City" services, operated by Class 323 electrical multiple units. The station is served by four trains an hour in each direction on weekdays and Saturdays (every 30 minutes on Sundays), with an average journey time to Birmingham New Street of around 21 minutes.

References

An Historical Survey Of Selected LMS Stations Vol. One Dr R Preston and R Powell Hendry. Oxford Pub. Co. (1982, Reprinted in 2001)

External links 

Rail Around Birmingham and the West Midlands: Sutton Coldfield railway station
Railways of Warwickshire entry
 BBC Page on the January 1955 accident

Sutton Coldfield
Railway stations in Birmingham, West Midlands
DfT Category D stations
Former London and North Western Railway stations
Railway stations in Great Britain opened in 1862
Railway stations served by West Midlands Trains
1862 establishments in England